Thallon is a town and a locality in the Shire of Balonne, Queensland, Australia.

There is a second town within the locality, Nindigully.

Geography 

The town is situated in roughly towards the east of the locality. The Moonie River flows from south to north through the locality and just to the west of the town. The Carnarvon Highway passes from north to south through the locality and through the town (as Hill Street) connecting the town to St George to the north and Mungindi on the border with New South Wales. The South-Western railway line passes through the locality from east to west and the town is served for freight rail by the Thallon railway station.

Thallon is a major wheat and woolgrowing area.

History 

Gamilaraay (Gamilaroi, Kamilaroi, Comilroy) is a language from South-West Queensland and North-West New South Wales. The Gamilaraay language region includes the landscape within the local government boundaries of the Balonne Shire Council, including the towns of Dirranbandi, Thallon, Talwood and Bungunya as well as the border towns of Mungindi and Boomi extending to Moree, Tamworth and Coonabarabran in NSW.

Explorer Thomas Mitchell was the first European in the Thallon district and his initials can still be found on a bloodwood tree near the Moonie River.

The town's name comes from its railway station, which in turn was named on 17 January 1911 by the Queensland Railways Department after James Forsyth Thallon (1847-1911) who was the Queensland Commissioner for Railways from 1900 to 1911.

With the coming of the railway, the town developed and shops and a hotel were established.

Thallon State School opened on 24 July 1911.

Myrtlemount Provisional School, Warrie Provisional School and Hollymount Provisional School (all named after local pastoral stations) opened on 29 September 1919 as a group of part-time schools (sharing a teacher between them). All three schools closed in 1922 due to low student numbers.

Heritage listings 

Thallon has the following heritage-listed sites:
 by the Moonie River: Bullamon Homestead

Facilities

Thallon has a post office, hotel, community hall, showground, park and sportsground.

Balonne Shire Council operates a library in William Street.

The Thallon-Daymar branch of the Queensland Country Women's Association has its rooms at 47 William Street.

Education 
Thallon State School is a government primary (Prep-6) school for boys and girls at 15 Henry Street. In 2017, the school had an enrolment of 36 students with 4 teachers (3 full-time equivalent) and 7 non-teaching staff (3 full-time equivalent).

There is no secondary school in Thallon; the nearest is in neighbouring St George.

William the Wombat 

In 2015, the town of Thallon decided to build a large statue of a northern hairy-nosed wombat as one of Australia's Big Things to attract tourists and to highlight the critically endangered status of the species which had once inhabited the Thallon area but is now extinct in that area. It arrived in Thallon in October 2017 and is on display in the park.

There is a small population of the wombats at the Richard Underwood Nature Refuge, located between St George and Surat, established in 2009.

Gallery

References

Further reading

External links 

 Town map of Thallon, 1974

 
Towns in Queensland
Shire of Balonne
Localities in Queensland